Paracymoriza aurantialis is a moth in the family Crambidae. It was described by Charles Swinhoe in 1895. It is found in India and the Chinese provinces of Guangdong, Guangxi and Hainan.

References

Acentropinae
Moths described in 1895